Kota is a village in Y. Ramavaram Mandal, East Godavari district in the state of Andhra Pradesh in India.

Demographics 
 India census, this Village had a population of 469, out of which 266 were male and 203 were female. Population of children below 6 years of age were 11%. The literacy rate of the village is 56%.

References 

Villages in Y. Ramavaram mandal